James T. Henderson (born 10 June 1877) was an English professional footballer who played as a left-sided wing half.

Career
Born in Morpeth, Northumberland, Henderson started his career with his local club Morpeth Harriers in the Northern Alliance before signing for Reading in 1903. He moved on to Bradford City in May 1904, leaving the club in July 1905 after 14 league appearances to sign for Leeds City. His Leeds debut was their first-ever match in the Football League, which was against Bradford; his former club 1–0. He went on to play 75 league matches and five cup games in three seasons, before joining Preston North End in 1908.

After making only six league appearances for Preston, Henderson signed for Clapton Orient, joining his brother Bill. A year later he joined Rochdale, where he remained until transferring to South Liverpool in 1914. He returned to Rochdale after World War I and played for the club until December 1919. He later played non-League football for Rochdale Pioneers and worked as a trainer at Rochdale until 1930.

Away from football Henderson was also a good sprinter, running 100 yards in 11 second for Morpeth Harriers athletics club in 1908.

References

1877 births
Date of death missing
People from Morpeth, Northumberland
Footballers from Northumberland
English footballers
Morpeth Harriers F.C. players
Reading F.C. players
Bradford City A.F.C. players
Leeds City F.C. players
Preston North End F.C. players
Leyton Orient F.C. players
Rochdale A.F.C. players
South Liverpool F.C. (1890s) players
English Football League players
Association football wing halves
Rochdale A.F.C. non-playing staff